The Alstom Metropolis C830C is the second generation of communication-based train control (CBTC) electric multiple unit rolling stock in operation on the Circle line of Singapore's Mass Rapid Transit (MRT) system. 24 trainsets of 3 cars were manufactured by Shanghai Alstom Transport Co Ltd (a joint venture between Alstom and Shanghai Electric), with deliveries from end June 2014.

Tender 
The tender for trains under the contract 830C was opened together with another contract C751C for an additional 18 North East line trains which closed on 18 July 2011 with 5 bids. The Land Transport Authority has shortlisted all of them and the tender results was published on 1 February 2012.

Design
The body shell is identical to its predecessor, the C830, with slight differences such as a larger SMRT logo up front and a different interior. The reserved seats are coloured red to distinguish them from normal seats. Navy blue and yellow coloured seats are installed in the driving motor cars (end carriages) while the seats in the middle car are khaki. The train is equipped with traction motors louder than its predecessor, identical to those found on the M5 Series of the Amsterdam Metro.

Other changes include the inner layer of the doors finished in Bluish-Grey, a new Visual Passenger Information System, similar to the C951(A), located above the doors and a new gangway design similar to the C751C.

The headlights on C830Cs are also much brighter than those on the C830s.

Features

It features a Visual Passenger Information System, letting commuters know what the current and next station is, as well as green blinking lights which indicate the side of which the train doors will open when the train reaches the station.

There is also a dynamic in-train route display, which provides commuters with their route information throughout their journey, and also indicates which side the doors will open. DRMD panels are installed in these trains, which will be slightly modified in 2026 to include Keppel, Cantonment and Prince Edward Road stations on the Circle line Stage 6.

At most stations on the Circle line, the train doors will open on the right side, but some stations like Promenade (Towards HarbourFront) and Bayfront (Towards Stadium) as well as the terminal stations like Dhoby Ghaut and Marina Bay, some trains may open their doors on the left.

Driverless operation
The C830C is fully driverless under normal circumstances, using CBTC which do not require traditional "fixed-block track circuits" for determining train position. Instead, they rely on "continuous two-way digital communication" between each controlled train and a wayside control center, which may control an area of a railroad line, a complete line, or a group of lines. Recent studies consistently show that CBTC systems reduce life-cycle costs for the overall rail property and enhance operational flexibility and control.

Operational issues
Trainset 846 suffered from a faulty signalling hardware, resulting in intermittent signaling issues which caused widespread disruptions to the Circle MRT line for a week in both August and November 2016.

Train Formation
The configuration of a C830C in revenue service is Mc1–T–Mc2

The car numbers of the trains range from 841x to 864x, where x depends on the carriage type. Individual cars are assigned a 4 digit serial number by the rail operator SMRT Trains. A complete three-car trainset consists of one trailer (T) and two driving motor (Mc) cars permanently coupled together. For example, set 841 consists of carriages 8411, 8412, 8413.

 The first digit is always an 8.
 The second and third digits identify the set number.
 The fourth digit identifies the car number, where the first car has a 1, the second has a 2 and the third has a 3.
 Alstom built sets 841–864.

In popular culture
The train is featured in HBO series Westworld, as part of the third season.

References

External links

Mass Rapid Transit (Singapore) rolling stock
Alstom multiple units
Train-related introductions in 2015
750 V DC multiple units